College Park is a historic neighborhood of Central San Jose, California, located within the greater district of The Alameda.

History
The area has been called College Park since 1871, when the University of the Pacific built its campus in the area. The University existed in San Jose until 1923, when it moved to Stockton, California.

When University of the Pacific left College Park, Bellarmine College Preparatory took over its former campus.

Transportation
Caltrain rail stations:
College Park (Caltrain station)

Notable people
 Sara J. Dorr (1855–1924), temperance activist

External links
 College Park Neighborhood Association

Neighborhoods in San Jose, California